In a field of mathematics known as differential geometry, a Courant geometry was originally introduced by Zhang-Ju Liu, Alan Weinstein and Ping Xu in their investigation of doubles of Lie bialgebroids in 1997. Both this standard example and the double of a Lie bialgebra are special instances of Courant algebroids.

Definition
A Courant algebroid consists of the data a vector bundle  with a bracket , a non degenerate fiber-wise inner product , and a bundle map  subject to the following axioms,

Skew-Symmetric Definition

An alternative definition can be given to make the bracket skew-symmetric as

 

This no longer satisfies the Jacobi-identity axiom above. It instead fulfills a homotopic Jacobi-identity.

where T is

 

The Leibniz rule and the invariance of the scalar product become modified by the relation  and the violation of skew-symmetry gets replaced by the axiom 

The skew-symmetric bracket together with the derivation D and the Jacobiator T form a strongly homotopic Lie algebra.

Properties
The bracket is not skew-symmetric as one can see from the third axiom.  Instead it fulfills a certain Jacobi-identity (first axiom) and a Leibniz rule (second axiom).  From these two axioms one can derive that the anchor map ρ is a morphism of brackets: 

The fourth rule is an invariance of the inner product under the bracket.  Polarization leads to

Examples
An example of the Courant algebroid is the Dorfman bracket on the direct sum  with a twist introduced by Ševera, (1998) defined as:

where X,Y are vector fields,  ξ,η are 1-forms and H is a closed 3-form twisting the bracket.  This bracket is used to describe the integrability of generalized complex structures.

A more general example arises from a Lie algebroid A whose induced differential on  will be written as d again.  Then use the same formula as for the Dorfman bracket with H an A-3-form closed under d.

Another example of a Courant algebroid is a quadratic Lie algebra, i.e. a Lie algebra with an invariant scalar product.  Here the base manifold is just a point and thus the anchor map (and D) are trivial.

The example described in the paper by Weinstein et al. comes from a Lie bialgebroid, i.e. Here  with anchor  and the bracket is the skew-symmetrization of the above in X and α (equivalently in Y and β):

Dirac structures 
Given a Courant algebroid with the inner product  of split signature (e.g. the standard one ), then a Dirac structure is a maximally isotropic integrable vector subbundle L → M, i.e.
,

,

.

Examples 
As discovered by Courant and parallel by Dorfman, the graph of a 2-form ω ∈ Ω2(M) is maximally isotropic and moreover integrable iff dω = 0, i.e. the 2-form is closed under the de Rham differential, i.e. a presymplectic structure.

A second class of examples arises from bivectors  whose graph is maximally isotropic and integrable iff [Π,Π] = 0, i.e. Π is a Poisson bivector on M.

Generalized complex structures 
(see also the main article generalized complex geometry)

Given a Courant algebroid with inner product of split signature.  A generalized complex structure L → M is a Dirac structure in the complexified Courant algebroid with the additional property 

where  means complex conjugation with respect to the standard complex structure on the complexification.

As studied in detail by Gualtieri  the generalized complex structures permit the study of geometry analogous to complex geometry.

Examples 
Examples are beside presymplectic and Poisson structures also the graph of a complex structure J: TM → TM.

References

Further reading
 Dmitry Roytenberg:  Courant algebroids, derived brackets, and even symplectic supermanifolds, PhD thesis Univ. of California Berkeley (1999)

Differential geometry